Castelplanio is a comune (municipality) in the Province of Ancona in the Italian region Marche, located about  southwest of Ancona.

Castelplanio borders the following municipalities: Belvedere Ostrense, Maiolati Spontini, Poggio San Marcello, Rosora.

References

Cities and towns in the Marche